Super Asia Group is a Pakistani conglomerate company which has business interests in manufacturing of home appliances, motorcycles and rickshaws, fast food chains, and grocery stores. It is based in Gujranwala, Pakistan.

History
It was founded in 1975 by Mian Mohammad Din.

Companies
 Super Asia brand
 Whirlpool Pakistan
 Super Asia Motorcycles and Rickshaws
 Hardee's Pakistan, established in 2008

References

Conglomerate companies of Pakistan
Companies based in Punjab, Pakistan
Conglomerate companies established in 1975
Gujranwala
Pakistani companies established in 1975